Sunferries was a ferry company based in Townsville, Queensland.

It operated both ferry services to Magnetic Island and Palm Island, as well as charter and tour vessel services to the Great Barrier Reef.

In March 2011 it was acquired by the SeaLink Travel Group and was rebranded Sealink.

See also
Transport in Townsville, Queensland

References

Ferry companies of Queensland
Transport in Queensland
Transport in Townsville
Companies based in Queensland